, known simply as Gdleen, is a Japanese science fiction light novel series written by Yuto Ramon and illustrated by Hitoshi Yoneda. The first novel in the series, subtitled , was published in September 1989 by Kadokawa Shoten under the Sneaker Bunko imprint. It was adapted into an original video animation and released in 1990.

A role-playing video game based on the anime was developed by Jorudan and published by SETA, for the Super Famicom in 1991.

Plot 
The plot of Gdleen revolves around Ryūn who crash lands on the planet Gdleen. There he meets Fana and the two are soon entangled in a long-standing war between the Babaress and Miyorl tribes.

Media

Light novels 
Jikō Wakusei Gdleen series

 Gdleen series

Anime 
The OVA, called Gdleen, was directed by Takao Kato and Toyoo Ashida and based on a screenplay written by Michiru Shimada.

Video game 
The video game adaptation, called Gdleen, was designed by Yuhei Yamaguchi, while the music was composed by Psychosonic, You Ohyama, and Toshimichi Isoe. It is a single-player video game, and was the first role-playing game for the Super Famicom, released six months after the video game console's launch in Japan.

References

External links 
 

1989 Japanese novels
1990 anime OVAs
1991 video games
Japan-exclusive video games
Jorudan games
Kadokawa Dwango franchises
Light novels
Science fiction anime and manga
Science fiction video games
SETA Corporation games
Super Nintendo Entertainment System games
Super Nintendo Entertainment System-only games
Video games based on anime and manga
Video games developed in Japan